Limehouse (foaled February 26, 2001 in Florida) is an American Thoroughbred racehorse.  Campaigned by W. Cothran Campbell's Dogwood Stable and trained by leading trainer Todd Pletcher, the chestnut son of popular sire Grand Slam was purchased at the Fasig-Tipton sale (August 2002) as a yearling for $140,000.

Racehorse 

During his racing career, Limehouse won 7 of 21 starts, including the 2003 Bashford Manor Stakes (Grade 3), the 2004 Hutcheson Stakes (Grade 2), the 2004 Tampa Bay Derby (Grade 3), and the 2005 Brooklyn Handicap (Grade 2).  He also ran 3rd in the 2004 Blue Grass Stakes (Grade 1) and was 4th behind Smarty Jones in the 2004 Kentucky Derby at 42/1 odds.

Race Record

Stallion
Limehouse was retired sound after running 6th in the Breeders' Cup Mile in 2005 and began his stud duties at Vinery in Lexington, Kentucky for a fee of $17,500 for a single live cover breeding. His first crop began racing in 2009.  He is currently standing at O'Sullivan Farms in Charles Town, WV for a fee of $2,500 for a live foal breeding.

External links
 Limehouse's pedigree, with photo
 Limehouse's career past performances
 Limehouse at Vinery
 Stallion Register Limehouse

2001 racehorse births
Racehorses bred in Florida
Racehorses trained in the United States
Thoroughbred family 14-a